Willem van der Woude (15 January 1876 – 23 September 1974) was a Dutch mathematician and rector magnificus (chancellor) of the University of Leiden.

Education and career

Van der Woude studied at the University of Groningen, and subsequently, from 1901 to 1916, worked as a secondary school teacher in Deventer. In 1908 he received his Ph.D. from the University of Groningen under Pieter Hendrik Schoute with a thesis titled Over elkaar snijdende normalen aan een ellipsoide en een hyperellipsoide (On intersecting normals to an ellipsoid and a hyperellipsoid). From 1916 until his retirement as professor emeritus in 1947 he was professor of mathematics and mechanics at the University of Leiden.

In 1924 he was an invited speaker at the International Congress of Mathematicians in Toronto. In the years 1923, 1924, 1939 and 1940 he chaired the Royal Dutch Mathematical Society.

He acted as rector magnificus of the University of Leiden during three separate periods: 1934–1935, 1941–43 and 1945 (until he was succeeded by Berend George Escher).

Selected publications
  (On the intersection system of two algebraic curves)
  (On geometry and theories of space)

References

External links
 brief biography in: Gerrit van Dijk: Leidse hoogleraren wiskunde 1575-1975 (pag. 54-56) 

1876 births
1974 deaths
20th-century Dutch mathematicians
Academic staff of Leiden University
People from Dongeradeel
Rectors of universities in the Netherlands
University of Groningen alumni